Limit dextrinase (R-enzyme, amylopectin-1,6-glucosidase, dextrin alpha-1,6-glucanohydrolase) is an enzyme with systematic name dextrin 6-alpha-glucanohydrolase. This enzyme catalyses the  hydrolysis of (1->6)-alpha-D-glucosidic linkages in alpha- and beta-limits dextrins of amylopectin and glycogen, in amylopectin and pullulan.

See also 
 Sucrase-isomaltase, an enzyme
 Pullulanase, an enzyme

References

External links 
 

EC 3.2.1